Holm is a village in the municipality of Bindal in Nordland county, Norway. Holm is also the site of Solstad Church, one of the two churches in the municipality. It is also the quay for the Bindal–Vennesund Ferry which connects Bindal and Sømna.

References

Villages in Nordland
Ferry quays in Nordland
Bindal